Geylord Coveta (born August 25, 1981) is a Filipino sailor who competes in the Mistral, RS:X, RS:One racing classes. He took up the sport of sailing in 1997. He competed at the 2014 Asian Games where he was selected as flag-bearer for his country. He studied at the University of Batangas.

External links
Geylord Coveta - 2014 Asian Games Profile

1981 births
Living people
Filipino male sailors (sport)
Sailors at the 2014 Asian Games
Sailors at the 2018 Asian Games
Southeast Asian Games bronze medalists for the Philippines
Southeast Asian Games silver medalists for the Philippines
Southeast Asian Games medalists in sailing
Competitors at the 2011 Southeast Asian Games
Competitors at the 2013 Southeast Asian Games
Asian Games competitors for the Philippines